The First Secretary of the Tuvan regional branch of the Communist Party of the Soviet Union was the position of highest authority in the Tuvan AO (1944–1961) and the Tuvan ASSR (1961–1991) in the Russian SFSR of the Soviet Union. The position was created on October 13, 1944, and abolished in August 1991. The First Secretary was a de facto appointed position usually by the Politburo or the General Secretary himself.

List of First Secretaries of the Communist Party of Tuva

See also
Tuvan Autonomous Oblast
Tuvan Autonomous Soviet Socialist Republic

Notes

Sources
 World Statesmen.org

Regional Committees of the Communist Party of the Soviet Union
Politics of Tuva
1944 establishments in the Soviet Union
1991 disestablishments in the Soviet Union